Change of gauge is the process of converting a railway from one rail gauge to another.

Change of gauge or gauge change may also refer to:
Change of gauge (aviation), change of aircraft without changing the flight number
Break-of-gauge a location where two railroad lines of different gauge meet
Bogie exchange, a system for operating railway wagons on two or more gauges by switching bogies
Variable gauge, a system using adjustable wheel sets where the gauge is altered by driving the train through a gauge changer
Dual gauge, the use of additional rails are laid to accommodate two different gauges on the same track
 Track gauge conversion, replacing a railway track of one track gauge with a railway track of another track gauge

See also
Gauge fixing, a mathematical procedure for coping with redundant degrees of freedom in field variables